Georgy Fedorovich Aleksandrov (Russian: Гео́ргий Фёдорович Алекса́ндров; 22 March 1908 – 7 July 1961) was a Marxist philosopher and a Soviet politician and statesman.

Biography

Childhood and education
Aleksandrov was born in 1908 in Saint Petersburg in a worker's family of Russian ethnicity, but became homeless during the Russian Civil War. In 1924-1930, he studied Communist philosophy in Borisoglebsk and Tambov and then transferred to the Moscow Institute of History and Philosophy. He became a member of the Communist Party in 1928. After graduating in 1932, Aleksandrov remained with the Institute for graduate studies, eventually becoming a professor, a deputy director and the Institute's Scientific Secretary.

Communist official
In 1938, at the height of the Great Purge, Aleksandrov was made deputy head of the Publishing Department of the Executive Committee of the Comintern. In 1939 he was appointed deputy head of the Soviet Communist Party's Central Committee's Propaganda and Agitation Department and at the same time put in charge of the Central Committee's Moscow-based Higher Party School, which he headed until 1946.

In September 1940 Aleksandrov was made head of the Central Committee's Propaganda and Agitation Department, replacing Andrei Zhdanov who, as a Secretary of the Central Committee, retained overall supervision over Communist propaganda in the USSR. In 1941 Aleksandrov was also made a candidate (non-voting) member of the Central Committee and, on 19 March 1946, a member of its Orgburo. In 1946 he was also elected a member of the Soviet Academy of Sciences.

1947 demotion
Throughout his career, Aleksandrov was closely associated with Georgy Malenkov, who was one of Joseph Stalin's closest advisors. Once Malenkov began to lose influence to Zhdanov in 1946, Aleksandrov's position became shaky as well. In June 1947, Aleksandrov's textbook History of Western European Philosophy (1945) was denounced on Stalin's orders for overvaluing Georg Wilhelm Friedrich Hegel's contributions and underestimating the contributions made by Russian philosophers. Aleksandrov lost his Propaganda and Agitation Department position to Mikhail Suslov and his supporters were purged. Nonetheless, Aleksandrov retained his Orgburo post and was made Director of the Soviet Academy of Sciences Institute of Philosophy. He remained there even after Zhdanov's demotion and subsequent death in 1948 and Malenkov's return to power.

After Stalin
When Georgy Malenkov became the next Soviet Premier after Joseph Stalin's death in March 1953, he made Aleksandrov his minister of culture on 9 March 1954. After Malenkov lost his position in a power struggle with the Soviet Communist Party leader Nikita Khrushchev in February 1955, Aleksandrov was fired on 10 March 1955. Nikolai Mikhailov succeeded him as minister of culture.

Aleksandrov was sent to Minsk where he was put in charge of the section of dialectical and historical materialism of the Institute of Philosophy and Law at Belarus Academy of Sciences. He spent the rest of his life working on sociology and its history. He died in Moscow in 1961 at age 53.

References

Further reading 
 K.A. Zalessky. Imperiya Stalina: Biograficheskij entsiklopedicheskij slovar, Moscow, Veche, 2000.

1908 births
1961 deaths
Politicians from Saint Petersburg
People from Sankt-Peterburgsky Uyezd
Central Committee of the Communist Party of the Soviet Union candidate members
Culture ministers of the Soviet Union
Second convocation members of the Soviet of the Union
Fourth convocation members of the Soviet of Nationalities
Head of Propaganda Department of CPSU CC
Moscow State University alumni
Institute of Red Professors alumni
Full Members of the USSR Academy of Sciences
Stalin Prize winners
Recipients of the Order of Lenin
Recipients of the Order of the Red Banner of Labour
Burials at Novodevichy Cemetery